Mason Inlet is an ice-filled inlet which recedes  southwest between Cape Mackintosh and the coastline south of Cape Herdman, along the east coast of Palmer Land, Antarctica. It was first seen and photographed from the air in December 1940 by members of the United States Antarctic Service, and during 1947 was photographed from the air by the Ronne Antarctic Research Expedition, who in conjunction with the Falkland Islands Dependencies Survey (FIDS) charted it from the ground. The inlet was named by the FIDS for D.P. Mason, their surveyor on the joint British–American sledge journey during the charting of this coast in 1947.

References

Inlets of Palmer Land